Talascend is a nationwide, veteran-owned staffing company founded in 2009. Headquartered in Troy, Michigan, the company has 5 offices nationwide and employs 800 people.

The company operates predominantly in the Oil & Gas, Power, Manufacturing, Automotive, IT, Nuclear energy, Healthcare IT, and Telecoms industries with a growing presence in the Supply Chain/eCommerce marketplace.

Talascend was formed from the merger of three engineering recruitment companies in September 2008. EPCglobal, founded and owned by Bechtel; Quality Technical Services, the Mobile based EPC specialist and Modern Professional Services, a well known name in the Detroit automotive market in business since 1946.

The Talascend Training Academy trains engineers and designers for jobs in other industries, when jobs in their current area of expertise are in low demand. The Academy has successfully created jobs for engineering designers within the distressed Detroit market.

The Oil & Gas industry is the key beneficiary of the cross trained engineers.

Talascend has retained its headquarters in Detroit and has been actively involved in pushing the engineering and construction industry to make Michigan a part of future planning, beyond the auto industry.

References 

Engineering companies of the United States
Human resource management consulting firms